Ilan Goodman is an English actor who trained at RADA. He is the son of English actor Henry Goodman. He has appeared extensively on stage in the UK  including the UK premieres of Adam Rapp's Red Light Winter Lynn Nottage's Intimate Apparel, and Joshua Harmon's Bad Jews.

He is also the producer and host of the podcast NOUS, where he interviews philosophers, neuroscientists and psychiatrists.

Filmography

Television

Films

References

External links
 

Alumni of RADA
21st-century English male actors
English male film actors
English male stage actors
English male television actors
Place of birth missing (living people)
Year of birth missing (living people)
Living people